The Alexandria tramway network serves the city of Alexandria, Egypt. It is one of only a few tram systems in the world that uses double-deck cars; other examples are Blackpool in the UK and Hong Kong.

History 

The license to build a tramway system was issued on 16 August 1860, and the first line of the network began operating in on 8 January 1863. The system was electrified in 1902. In addition to the Al Raml line, there is an extensive network of tram lines running in the streets of central and western Alexandria.

A small museum about the trams was opened at Raml station in 2017.

Fare 

, the price of a single tram ride depends on the standard of the tramcar. If the tram does not have curtains (usually the last carriage), the price is £E1. For a carriage with curtains, the price is £E2.  A special "Tram Café" was inaugurated in 2015, on which a fare of £E5 is charged.

Fleet

Current cars in use:

 Japan Kinki Sharyo/Fuji Heavy Industries 1982 (28 cars from 2 orders)
 Japan Kinki Sharyo 1975-1995 (25 cars with 6 double-decker cars)
 Hungary Ganz-Mavag EMU 1985-86 (29 cars)
 Egypt SEMAF (ARE) 2009 (3 cars - designed by Kinki Sharyo)
 Ukraine K-1E6 (15 cars from 15 orders)

Works cars

 Austria Plasser & Theurer 1990s (1 work car - track tamper)
 Poland NEWAG Oberhausen 2005 (1 work car) and 1997 (1 work car)

Retired or in storage

 Switzerland - Maschinenfabrik Oerlikon 1925 (1 work car and now museum piece)
 Germany - Duewag GT-6 1960-66 (97 cars- second hand from Copenhagen Tramways and mostly retired)
 Former Czechoslovakia - ČKD Several second-hand KT4D from Potsdam and Berlin Tramways, built by the former Czechoslovak manufacturer Tatra and acquired in 2015. These vehicles are not yet in use by 2017.
 Canada/United States - Canadian Car and Foundry/St. Louis Car Company PCC - Alexandria acquired 140 used Toronto PCC streetcars in 1968, but all retired in 1984.

Source: Cairo and Alexandria Tram fleet

Tram lines 
The tram transportation system in Alexandria consists of two systems:

Tram Al Ramlh 

Al Ramlh trams cars are characterized by their blue and cream livery.

Route 1 serves the following stations:

 Al Nasr (Victoria)
 Al Seyouf
 Sidi Beshr
 Al Saraya
 Laurent Louran
 Tharwat
 San Stefano
 Gianaclis
 Schutz (Shods)
 Safar
 Abou Shabana aka Baccos
 Al Karnak
 Al Wezara (The Ministry)
 Isis Bolkly (Bulkeley)
 Roushdy
 Mohammed Mahfouz
 Mustafa Kamil
 Sidi Gaber Al Sheikh (Bus & Railway Station)
 Cleopatra Hammamat (Cleopatra Baths)
 Cleopatra Al Soghra
 Al Reyada Al Kobra (Sporting Al Kobra)
 Al Reyada Al Soghra (Sporting Al Soghra)
 Al Ibrahimiyya
 Al Moaskar (Camp Caesar)
 Al Gamaa (The University)
 Al Shatby
 Al Shobban Al Moslemin
 Al Shahid Moustafa Ziean
 Hassan Rasim (Azarita)
 Gamea' Ibrahim (Mosque of Ibrahim)
 Mahattet Al Ramleh (Ramlh Station)

Route 2 serves the following stations:

 Al Nasr (Victoria)
 Al Seyouf
 Sidi Beshr
 Al Saraya
 Laurent Louran
 Tharwat
 San Stefano
 Kasr Al Safa (Al Safa Palace)  (Zizini)
 Al Fonoun Al Gamella (The Fine Arts)
 Ramsis (Glym or Gleem) (Glymenopoulo)
 Al Bostan (Saba Pasha)
 Al Hedaya (The Guidance)
 Isis Bolkly (Bulkeley)
 Roushdy
 Mohammed Mahfouz
 Mustafa Kamil
 Sidi Gaber Al Mahata
 Cleopatra (Zananere)
 Al Reyada Al Kobra (Sporting Al Kobra)
 Al Reyada Al Soghra (Sporting Al Soghra)
 Al Ibrahimiyya
 Al Moaskar (Camp Caesar)
 Al Gamaa (The University)
 Al Shatby
 Al Shobban Al Moslemin
 Al Shahid Moustafa Ziean
 Hassan Rasim (Azarita)
 Gamea' Ibrahim (Mosque of Ibrahim)
 Mahattet Al Ramleh (Ramlh Station)

Route 25 (Red and Yellow Tram) runs on both Tram Al Ramlh and Tram Al Medina tracks and serves the following stations:

 Sidi Gaber Al Sheikh (Bus & Railway Station)
 Cleopatra Hammamat (Cleopatra Baths)
 Cleopatra Al Soghra
 Al Reyada Al Kobra (Sporting Al Kobra)
 Al Reyada Al Soghra (Sporting Al Soghra)
 Al Ibrahimiyya
 Al Moaskar (Camp Caesar)
 Al Gamaa (The University)
 Al Shatby
 Al Shobban Al Moslemin
 Al Shahid Moustafa Ziean
 Hassan Rasim (Azarita)
 Gamea' Ibrahim (Mosque of Ibrahim)
 Mahattet Al Ramleh (Ramlh Station)
 Al Mahkama (The Courts)
 Al Matafi (Al Tahreer Square)
 Al Koweri
 Al Kahwet Farouk
 Abu Al Abbas (Mosque)
 Al Nokrashi
 Al-Anfoushi (Citadel of Qaitbay)
 Kasr Al Thakafa
 Al Haggary
 Kahwet Annah
 Maktabet Susan Mubarak
 Ras Al Tin (Routes 6 and 21 terminate here)

Route 36 (Red and Yellow Tram) runs on both Tram Al Ramlh and Tram El Medina tracks and serves the following stations:

 San Stefano
 Gianaclis
 Schutz (Shods)
 Safar
 Abou Shabana aka Baccos
 Al Karnak
 Al Wezara (The Ministry)
 Isis Bolkly (Bulkeley)
 Roushdy
 Mohammed Mahfouz
 Mustafa Kamil
 Sidi Gaber Al Mahata
 Cleopatra (Zananere)
 Al Reyada Al Kobra (Sporting Al Kobra)
 Al Reyada Al Soghra (Sporting Al Soghra)
 Al Ibrahimiyya
 Al Moaskar (Camp Caesar)
 Al Gamaa (The University)
 Al Shatby
 Al Shobban Al Moslemin
 Al Shahid Moustafa Ziean
 Hassan Rasim (Azarita)
 Gamea' Ibrahim (Mosque of Ibrahim)
 Mahattet Al Ramleh (Ramlh Station)
 Al Mahkama (The Courts)
 Al Matafi (Al Tahreer Square)
 Al Koweri
 Al Kahwet Farouk
 Abu Al Abbas (Mosque)
 Al Nokrashi
 Al Anfoushi (Citadel of Qaitbay)
 Kasr Al Thakafa
 Al Haggary
 Kahwet Annah
 Maktabet Susan Mubarak
 Ras Al Tin (Routes 6 and 21 terminate here)

Tram Al Madina 

Characterised with its yellow colour except for routes 25 & 36 these are red and yellow.

There are 16 routes on this network.

1. Nozha - El Khedewi- Metras.

2. Noxha - El Shohadaa - Karmouz.

3.  Metras - El Sabaa Banat - St Cathrine.

4. Moharam Bek - Abi El Dardaa - St Cathrine Square.

6. Moharam Bek - El Khedewi - El Gomork - Ras El Tin.

7. Nozha - El Khedewi - El Max - El Wardian.

9. El Shohadaa - El Khedewi - Metras - El Max.

10. Nozha - El Shohadaa - El Shbaa Banat.

11. Nozha - Moharam Bek - El Shohadaa.

15. Ramlh - El Sayed Karaiem - Ras El Tin.

16. Karmouz - Abi El Dardaa - St Cathrine Square. (Serapeum & Pompey's Pillar)

18. Nozha - Abi El Dardaa - St Cathrine Square.

19. El Shohadaa - El Khedewi - Metras - El Max.

21. Metras - Bab El Karasta - Gomrok - Ras El Tin.

25. Sidi Gaber - El Matafi. (Bus & Railway Station)

36. Ras El Tin - San Stefano.

See also 
Transportation in Alexandria

Notes

References

External links 

Alexandria Passenger Transportation Authority (APTA) – tram operator
Alexandria at UrbanRail.Net
Alexandria Tram at trampicturebook.de
Tram Travels: Alexandria Passengers Transport Authority (APTA)

Alexandria
Alexandria
Tramways with double-decker trams
Transport in Alexandria